is a 1995 Japanese horror film directed by Shimako Sato. The film is based on the manga Eko Eko Azarak, and stars Kimika Yoshino as a transfer student to a new school, who is secretly a witch travelling from school to school in order to dispel the work of the devil.

The film was shown at the Toronto International Film Festival in 1995. The film was followed by two sequels, starting with Eko Eko Azarak II: Birth of the Wizard in 1996.

Plot

A mysterious cabal of red-garbed magicians have been murdering inhabitants of an unnamed Japanese city. Their latest victim is a woman who is decapitated while the magicians perform a ritual with a voodoo doll. The object of the murders to provide the five geographical points of a giant pentagram, with a high school in the nexus. The magicians' ultimate aim is to summon Lucifer himself.

Misa Kuroi, a transfer student at the school, is a witch of considerable power and has come to battle the evil magicians. However, Misa has some difficulty getting classmates to trust her.

Cast
Kimika Yoshino as Misa Kuroi
Miho Kanno as Mizuki Kurohashi 
Miho Tamura as Maki Yoshida 
Kanori Kadomatsu as Kazzumi Tanaka

Production
Shimako Sato, the director of Eko Eko Azarak: Wizard of Darkness, had previously filmed Tale of a Vampire (1992) in the United Kingdom. She returned to Japan with the desire to make a film about witchcraft and magic. She recalled the manga series Eko Eko Azarak from the 1970s, and began adapting it for cinema.

The film was shot in two weeks, and featured the cinematic debut of Kimika Yoshino. Yoshino received her script a day before shooting had started and before she had even met the director. 
.

Release
Eko Eko Azarak: Wizard of Darkness was released in Japan on April 8, 1995. It was shown at the Toronto Film Festival in September 1995.

A DVD of the film was released by Tokyo Shock on December 16, 2003. The disc included footage of the films premiere, the trailer, and interviews with the director and Kimika Yoshino.

Reception
Variety gave the film a positive review, referring to it as "high-octane, modestly produced occult thriller is top-notch genre fare", and that "obviously plowing a familiar celluloid field, director/co-writer Sato demonstrates not only a visual flair for the genre, but a wicked sense of humor that deftly counterbalances the per force conventions of this type of story."

The film won the Minami Toshiko Award at the 1995 Yubari International Fantastic Film Festival. It was also selected for the official competition for best film at the 1997 Fantasporto.

Aftermath
Shimako Sato returned to the direct the follow-up film Eko Eko Azarak II: Birth of the Wizard (1996).

Notes

References

External links

1995 horror films
1995 films
Japanese horror films
Japanese supernatural horror films
Live-action films based on manga
Films directed by Shimako Satō
1990s Japanese films